2007 Universiade may refer to:

2007 Summer Universiade, which were held in Bangkok, Thailand
2007 Winter Universiade, which were held in Turin, Italy